"The 'Sweetest Girl'" is a song written by Welsh singer Green Gartside. It was originally performed by Gartside's band Scritti Politti, and released in 1981 as a single. The single peaked at No. 64 in the UK Singles Chart. The keyboards are played by Robert Wyatt.

The song became a marginally bigger hit five years later, when covered by ska band Madness. Their version of the song peaked at No. 35 in the UK and No. 29 in Ireland in early 1986. Madness changed the title of the song slightly, losing both the definite article and the quotation marks around the last two words in "The 'Sweetest Girl, thereby rendering it as "Sweetest Girl".

Scritti Politti version

Artwork
As with the cover artwork for all of the singles from Songs to Remember (1982), "The 'Sweetest Girl pays homage to the packaging of a luxury consumer item, which in this case was Dunhill cigarettes. Gartside claimed that the idea behind the singles' sleeves was to "convey a sense of a common, available thing which is classy, like our records now".

Track listing
The B-side "Lions After Slumber" takes its title from, and quotes in its final lines from, the 1819 political poem The Masque of Anarchy by Percy Bysshe Shelley.

7" and 12" vinyl (UK, US, Germany)

7" vinyl (France, Japan)

Personnel
Source:
 Robert Wyatt – keyboards
 Green Gartside – vocals, guitar
 Joe Cang – bass
 Nial Jinks – bass
 Lorenza, Mae, Jackie – chorus
 Tom Morley – LinnDrum

Madness version

The cover of the song by ska and pop band Madness was included on their sixth studio album Mad Not Mad (1985), and released as a single the following year. The song spent six weeks on the UK Singles Chart, peaking at No. 35. Whilst reflecting on the Mad Not Mad album, the band's lead vocalist Suggs said that "The Sweetest Girl" was my idea – let’s get really serious and take a song that we don't even understand."

Music video
The song's music video was featured in the 1986 BBC Omnibus documentary Video Jukebox.

Critical reception
Upon its release as a single, Simon Witter of NME noted how Suggs' "slightly monotone delivery is bolstered by gorgeous harmonies and an inventive rearrangement". He predicted the song would be a hit. Dave Rimmer of Smash Hits described it as "a rather strained version of the first decent song Scritti Politti ever wrote" and added that it "limps and stumbles all the way through". Frank Hopkinson of Number One commented, "The record's light, slow with subtle changes of pace and Suggs singing at his most plaintive."

Track listing

7" vinyl

 Horns:- Gary Barnacle
 Backing Vocals:- Afrodiziak

12" vinyl

Charts

References

External links
  - Scritti Politti
  - Madness version

1981 singles
Scritti Politti songs
1986 singles
Madness (band) songs
1981 songs
Songs written by Green Gartside
Rough Trade Records singles
Song recordings produced by Clive Langer
Song recordings produced by Alan Winstanley
Zarjazz singles